Farrell Publications is the name of a series of American comic book publishing companies founded and operated by Robert W. Farrell in the 1940s and 1950s, including Elliot Publishing Company, Farrell Comic Group, and Excellent Publications. Farrell is particularly known for its pre-Comics Code horror comics, mostly produced by the S. M. Iger Studio. Farrell also published romance, Western, adventure, superhero, and talking animal comics. Farrell acted as editor throughout. In addition to packaging art for Farrell from the beginning, Jerry Iger was the company's art director from 1955–1957.

History

Robert Farrell 
Robert W. Farrell (born Izzy Katz) entered the comics field in the late 1930s after a decade spent as an attorney. He wrote for the syndicated newspaper strip Scorchy Smith, and wrote comics stories for the packagers Eisner & Iger (sometimes using the names Bob Farrow and Bob Lerraf.) Farrell wrote many comics throughout the 1940s, though usually without attribution, as most stories produced during the period didn't contain credits.

In 1940, Farrell worked as an editor for Fox Comics. Together, Farrell and Fox publisher Victor S. Fox developed the Comicscope, a cheaply produced comic strip projector sold in the pages of Fox Comics.

Farrell Publications 
Farrell began Farrell Publications in 1940, operating until 1948. From 1940–1945, he was co-owner of the Elliot Publishing Company, (known for their imprint Gilberton, which became independent during that period). Some of Farrell's imprints and brands from this era were American Feature Syndicate, Four Star Publications, and Kiddie Kapers Company. Probably the most notable title produced during this period was Captain Flight Comics, published under the Four Star brand.

Farrell Comic Group 
After a short hiatus, Farrell founded the Farrell Comic Group in 1951 with the financial backing of Excellent Publications. Imprints included America's Best, Ajax Publications, Ajax-Farrell, Decker Publications, Red Top Comics, Steinway Comics, and World Famous. No matter the imprint, most titles had the words "A Farrell Publication."

Contributors to Farrell titles from this period included Ken Battefield, L. B. Cole (who had previously contributed covers to Captain Flight), Matt Baker, Bruce Hamilton, and Steve Ditko. (The company published Ditko's first professional comics work. He had illustrated writer Bruce Hamilton's science fiction story "Stretching Things" for the Key Publications imprint Stanmor Publications, which sold the story to Farrell, where it finally found publication in Fantastic Fears #5 [Feb. 1954].)

Farrell's horror line consisted of Fantastic Fears, Haunted Thrills, Strange Fantasy, and Voodoo. All four books were produced by the Iger Studio and featured a consistent "house style." Like many horror comics, all four titles fell victim of the Senate Subcommittee on Juvenile Delinquency and were cancelled by the end of 1954.

In 1954 Farrell acquired the rights to the Phantom Lady comic strip series, previously owned by Fox Feature Syndicate and before that, Quality Comics. Farrell published four issues of the short-lived title from January to June 1954. The company also published Phantom Lady backup stories in two issues of its comic Wonder Boy. Phantom Lady as well fell under the baleful gaze of anti-comics crusader Fredric Wertham, who objected to the character's titillating costume. Changes were consequently made so that her cleavage was covered and shorts replaced her skirt.

After the cancellation of its popular horror titles in early 1955, Farrell received a cash infusion from Dearfield Publishing, which became a key investor. The company switched focus to romance, Western, and talking animal comics. In 1957, Farrell and former Iger studio-mate Myron Fass attempted to re-enter the horror/fantasy field with a quartet of Comics Code-approved titles made up of pre-Code material with the goriest panels excised. This resulted in incoherent stories and flat sales.

The company continued publishing until 1958, but never with the same success.

Robert Farrell's later career 
Farrell left the comics field and went into magazine and newspaper publishing.

In 1958, he started the humor magazine Panic (published by Health Publications).

In 1960, he acquired the Brooklyn Eagles assets in bankruptcy court, publishing five Sunday editions of the paper in 1960. In 1962–1963, under the corporate name Newspaper Consolidated Corporation''', Farrell and his partner Philip Enciso briefly revived the paper as a daily. (The Brooklyn Eagle has since been revived again, publishing from 1996 to the present.)

From 1969–1981, Farrell worked for Myron Fass, as publisher of the schlocky black-and-white horror magazine publisher Eerie Publications. During this time, he briefly revived the defunct New York Daily Mirror (in name only), publishing it from 1971–1972.

 Titles include 
 All True Romance (13 issues, 1955–1958) — acquired from Comic Media; Ajax imprint
 Bride's Secrets (19 issues, 1954–1958) — Ajax imprint
 Captain Flight Comics (11 issues, 1944–1947) — Four Star Publications imprint
 Fantastic Fears (9 issues, 1953–1954) — Farrell/Ajax imprint
 Haunted Thrills (18 issues, 1952–1954) — Farrell/Ajax imprint
 The Lone Rider (26 issues, 1951 - 1955) — Farrell/Ajax imprint
 Phantom Lady (4 issues, 1954–1955) — originally published by Quality Comics, Fox Features Syndicate, and Star Publications; Ajax imprint
 Samson (3 issues, 1955) — originally published by Fox Features Syndicate; Ajax imprint
 Strange Fantasy (13 issues, 1952–1954) — Farrell/Ajax imprint
 Voodoo (19 issues, 1952–1955) — Farrell/Ajax imprint
 Wonder Boy'' (2 issues, 1955) — originally published by Quality Comics; Ajax imprint

Notes

References 
 
 Ajax-Farrell (Excellent Publications)  at the Comic Book DB
 
 
 
 
 
 
 
 

Defunct comics and manga publishing companies
Comic book publishing companies of the United States